Phyllonorycter kearfottella is a moth of the family Gracillariidae. It is known from Connecticut, New Jersey, Kentucky, Maine, New York and Washington in the United States.

The wingspan is about 7 mm.

The larvae feed on Castanea species, including Castanea dentata, Castanea mollissima and Castanea sativa. They mine the leaves of their host plant. The mine has the form of a rather small elongate mine on the underside of the leaf. It is placed between two veins. The pupa is enclosed in a loose, semi-transparent silken cocoon.

References

kearfottella
Moths of North America
Moths described in 1908